Sakhvid Rural District is in Nir District of Taft County, Yazd province, Iran. At the National Census of 2006, its population was 1,747 in 565 households. There were 1,766 inhabitants in 606 households at the following census of 2011. At the most recent census of 2016, the population of the rural district was 1,420 in 550 households. The largest of its 145 villages was Tudeh, with 217 people.

References 

Taft County

Rural Districts of Yazd Province

Populated places in Yazd Province

Populated places in Taft County